Bani Saba'a is a sub-district located in Yarim District, Ibb Governorate, Yemen. Bani Saba'a had a population of 7781 as of  2004.

References 

Sub-districts in Yarim District